Cocos Malay is a post-creolized variety of Malay, spoken by the Cocos Malays of Home Island, Christmas Island, and those originally from the Cocos Islands currently living in Sabah.

Cocos Malay derives from the Malay trade languages of the 19th century, specifically the Betawi language. Malay is offered as a second language in schools, and Indonesian has prestige status; both are influencing the language, bringing it more in line with standard Malay. There is also a growing influence of English, considering the Islands having been an Australian territory and globalization drifting modern terms into the daily parlance. In 2009, Cocos Malay students were prohibited from using their own language and failure to comply resulted in punishment in the form of "speaking tickets" which meant that they were required to carry out cleaning duties in school. However, this form of language restriction ended by 2011.

Characteristics
It has the following characteristics:

 Javanese influence:  "shark",  "papaya",  "shoulderblade" etc.
 First-person and second-person singular "" "", from Hokkien.
 Causative verb "".
 "" not only means "there is ...", but also is the progressive particle.
 Possessive marker "".
 Third person indefinite "", from  "person"

Phonology

Vowels

Consonants 

There are three ways in which Cocos Malay differs from Standard Malay and Indonesian:
 The uvular [ʁ] which always occurs intervocalically is present in Coco Malay but not in Standard Malay or Indonesian.
 Certain consonants, [f v ʃ z], which occur in Standard Malay are not present in Cocos Malay.
 With regard to the [h] amongst the three languages, the [h] in Cocos Malay is often dropped, especially in word-initial position. Examples include:
{| class="wikitable"
|-
! Standard Malay !! Cocos Malay !! English Gloss
|-
| [ˈhisap˺] || [ˈisap˺] || 'suck'
|-
| [ˈhuta̪ n] || [ˈuta̪ n] || 'forest'
|-
| [ˈhiduŋ] || [ˈiduŋ] || 'nose'
|-
| [ˈhaus] || [ˈaus] || 'thirsty'
|}

Further reading

References 

Languages of the Cocos (Keeling) Islands
Javanese language
Languages of Indonesia
Languages of Sabah
Languages of Malaysia
Malay-based pidgins and creoles
Pidgins and creoles of Australia